Han Seong-cheol (born 18 April 1948) is a South Korean judoka. He competed in the men's lightweight event at the 1972 Summer Olympics.

References

1948 births
Living people
South Korean male judoka
Olympic judoka of South Korea
Judoka at the 1972 Summer Olympics
Place of birth missing (living people)